Philip William Buchen (February 27, 1916 – May 21, 2001) was an American attorney who served as White House counsel during the Ford Administration.

Early life and education 
Buchen was born in Sheboygan, Wisconsin, the son of State Senator Gustave W. Buchen. In his youth, he contracted polio and thereafter walked with a cane. He graduated from Sheboygan High School in 1935 and attended the University of Michigan, where he met Gerald Ford. At Michigan, he was a member of Delta Kappa Epsilon fraternity.

Career 
Buchen opened a law practice in Grand Rapids, Michigan with Ford in May 1941. He continued to practice law in Grand Rapids until 1974, when he came to Washington to serve in the Office of the Vice President of the United States. He served as chief White House counsel with Cabinet rank for the duration of Ford's presidency. When Ford left office, Buchen remained in Washington, practicing law with the firm of Dewey Ballantine until 1995. Buchen served on the United States Commission of Fine Arts from 1977 to 1981.

References

External links

The National Security Archive "Wiretap Debate Déjà Vu"

1916 births
2001 deaths
Ford administration cabinet members
White House Counsels
University of Michigan Law School alumni
People from Sheboygan, Wisconsin
20th-century American lawyers
Michigan lawyers
Michigan Republicans
Washington, D.C., Republicans
People with polio